John Sealy may refer to:

John Sealy Townsend, mathematical physicist who taught at Oxford University
John Sealy Hospital, a hospital that is a part of the University of Texas Medical Branch complex in Galveston, Texas, United States
USS John Sealy (SP-568), a United States Navy minesweeper in commission during 1917

See also
John Sealey (born 1945), English professional footballer 
John Seally (1741 or 1742–1795), English writer and clergyman